= Common Craft =

Common Craft is a small instructional video company owned by Sachi and Lee LeFever in Seattle, Washington, USA.

== Product ==
Electing A US President in Plain English

The company focuses on building a library of educational videos on a variety of topics that are easy to understand for people without a technical background. The videos use stop-action animation with whiteboards and paper cut-outs to illustrate the topic. Common Craft creates videos in four categories (Technology, Social Media, Internet Safety, Money and Society) and in five languages (English, French, German, Portuguese, and Spanish).

Since 2007, Common Craft has created over 70 videos that have been viewed millions of times online. One of the most popular films, "Twitter in Plain English", has been viewed over 10 million times since being published on the host's YouTube and dotSUB in March 2008. The video explaining how a president is elected in the United States has been viewed more than 600,000 times.

Common Craft also provides a video making service whereby Common Craft may be commissioned to produce a video. Common Craft has been hired by many companies to explain their products and services, including Ford for Sync and Google for Google Reader. A video made for Dropbox was placed on Dropbox's homepage and was viewed 25 million times.

Common Craft has made videos on a number of topics:

- Technology
- Social Media
- Internet Safety
- Money
- Society

== Awards ==
- Webby Award Honoree, Best Writing - 2009
- Webby Award Honoree, Technology Online Film and Video - 2008
- Merlot Classics Award, Faculty Development - 2008
